Intergenerationality is interaction between members of different generations. Sociologists study many intergenerational issues, including equity, conflict, and mobility.

Applicable concepts 
 Intergenerational equity is the concept or idea of fairness or justice in relationships between children, youth, adults, seniors, and/or future generations, particularly in terms of treatment and interactions.
 Intergenerational conflict is either a conflict situation between teenagers and adults or a more abstract conflict between two generations, which often involves all inclusive prejudices against another generation:
 Intergenerational cycle of violence is a pattern of violence or abuse that is passed from one generation to the next.  Generally, an individual who witnesses domestic violence as a child is much more likely to be an abuser or a victim of domestic abuse in adulthood.
 Intergenerational mobility is a measure of the changes in social status which occurs from the parents' to the children's generation.
 An inter-generational contract is a dependency between different generations based on the assumption that future generations, in honoring the contract, will provide a service to a generation that has previously provided the same service to an older generation.
 Intergenerational struggle is the economic conflict between successive generations of workers because of the public pension system where the first generation has better pension benefit and the last must pay more taxes, have a greater tax wedge and a lower pension benefit due to the public debt that the states make in order to pay the current public spending.
 Intergenerational policies are public policies that incorporate an intergenerational approach to addressing an issue or have an impact across the generations.
 Intergenerational shared sites are programs in which children, youth and older adults participate in ongoing services and/or programming concurrently at the same site, and where participants interact during regularly scheduled planned intergenerational activities, as well as through informal encounters.
 Inter-generational ministry is a model of Christian ministry which emphasizes relationships between age groups and encourages mixed-age activities.

Conflict
An intergenerational conflict is either a conflict situation between teenagers and adults or a more abstract conflict between two generations, which often involves all inclusive prejudices against another generation. This is a term describing one generation that, contrary to the will of another, will not help the other generation and also makes it difficult for the other generation to act.

Intergenerational conflict also describes cultural, social, or economic discrepancies between generations, which may be caused by shifts in values or conflicts of interest between younger and older generations. An example are changes to an inter-generational contract that may be necessary to reflect a change in demographics. It is associated with the term "generation gap".

According to social identity theory, people seek to classify themselves and others on the basis of perceived similarities and differences. Therefore, individuals may seek to classify themselves as belonging to a particular generation because they perceive oneness with traits popularly associated with other members of the group, and classify others into separate “out-groups” based on dissimilar characteristic. As individuals create in- and out-groups from generational identities, interactions between members can be impacted and conflict can occur. This bias between generations occurs because of the human need to belong to a social group to provide a sense of social identity, pride, and self esteem, but may also create stereotypes about those in different social groups, which may be generations.

Contract

An inter-generational contract is a dependency between different generations based on the assumption that future generations, in honoring the contract, will provide a service to a generation that has previously done the same service to an older generation. Under the concept of the intergenerational contract or agreement, written and/or unwritten rules of the redistribution of social status, which include wealth, power, and prestige, can exist between generations. It is the principle that different generations provide support to each other across the different stages of their lives. This contract functions in both our responsibilities within our families and within society as a whole, as well as the role of the government. The intergenerational contract generally works because everyone puts in and everyone takes out. The goal of the contract is to support the older generations because so as we grow old, we will believe and expect that we will be treated the same.

The most common use of the term is in statutory pension insurance provisions and refers to the consensus to provide pension for the retired generations through payments made by the working generations.

Cycle of violence
Intergenerational cycles of violence occur when violence is passed from father or mother to son or daughter, parent to child, or sibling to sibling.  It often refers to violent behavior learned as a child and then repeated as an adult, therefore continuing on in a perceived cycle. An example of this would be when a child witnesses domestic abuse, they may go on to repeat that same pattern of behavior in future relationships.

Equity

Intergenerational equity may be understood as equity in relation to equal rights under the law, such as security, political equity, voting rights, freedom of speech and assembly, property rights, economic equity, access to education, health care, and social security. "This equity can be horizontal—equal opportunities for the same generation in different collectivities—for example, young people in different countries. This equity is also vertical—different treatment of different generations in order to compensate for differences in, for example, education and place of origin."

Intergenerational equity, in the sociological and psychological context, is the concept or idea of fairness or justice in relationships between children, youth, adults and seniors, particularly in terms of treatment and interactions. It has been studied in environmental and sociological settings. In the context of institutional investment management, intergenerational equity is the principle that an endowed institution's spending rate must not exceed its after-inflation rate of compound return, so that investment gains are spent equally on current and future constituents of the endowed assets. This concept was originally set out in 1974 by economist James Tobin, who wrote that, "The trustees of endowed institutions are the guardians of the future against the claims of the present. Their task in managing the endowment is to preserve equity among generations."

Conversations about intergenerational equity occur across several fields. They include transition economics, social policy, and government budget-making.  Intergenerational equity is also explored in environmental concerns, including sustainable development, global warming and climate change.

Conversations about intergenerational equity are also relevant to social justice arenas as well, where issues such as health care are equal in importance to youth rights and youth voice are pressing and urgent. There is a strong interest within the legal community towards the application of intergenerational equity in law.

Intergenerational policies

An intergenerational policy is a public policy that incorporates an intergenerational approach to addressing an issue or has an impact across the generations. Approaching policy from an intergenerational perspective is based on an understanding of the interdependence and reciprocity that characterizes the relationship between the generations. These basic needs include things such as income, health care, social services, educational policy, employment policy, and architectural and environmental policies. Intergenerational policies include but are not limited to discourse and ways of resource distribution between generations. Such policies may be forced upon other generations through physical force or through symbolic violence by another generation, but can also be created through dialogue.

Intergenerational policies can be targeted to increase age integration by facilitating interaction between people of different age groups by supporting physical proximity, developing common interests, or by other mechanisms. The purpose of integration is to eliminate social barriers and difficulties associated with age, including discrimination on the grounds of age. These policies contain specific programs and actions aimed at supporting simultaneous participation of children, youth, and older adults.

An intergenerational approach to public policy recognizes that generations share basic needs including adequate income, access to quality health care and social services, educational and employment opportunities, and a safe place to live.  Further, policies that are supportive of any age group must build on the common concerns of all generations.

Intergenerational shared sites

Christianity

Intergenerational ministry is a model of Christian ministry which emphasizes relationships between age groups and encourages mixed-age activities.

Inter-generational ministry stands in contrast with other modes of ministry more traditionally seen in local churches, such as Sunday schools and youth ministries.

In Sunday school, children, youths, and sometimes adults, are instructed by teachers who are, typically, adults. Classes are usually divided by age groups, as in secular schools. In youth ministries, teens or young adults (especially college age) gather in groups presided over by a "youth minister". These groups, which are often part of parachurch organizations, focus on peer fellowship and instruction of their members.

These modes of ministry segregate members by age, and presuppose a hierarchical ministry in which more experienced, more educated, and generally older members minister didactically to their charges. Inter-generational activities, by contrast, emphasize a mixture of ages, and de-emphasize formal teacher-pupil relationships.

Inter-generational ministry is one of a number of movements which have arisen in response over concerns that young adults very commonly cease participation in church, and often do not return. Proponents of the inter-generational ministry movement hold that the hierarchical and didactic roles found in traditional church ministries deprive teens and young adults of a sense of purpose and involvement, since their role in these ministries is passive and subordinate, and since they are often kept separate from adult activities. Therefore, they propose that younger members should take active roles in the ministry of the local church, and that church activities should involve and encourage participation from members across a wide range of ages.

A second thread in the inter-generational ministry movement is that of family involvement. Concerns over divorce, abuse and other family disruptions led to criticism of how traditional church activities typically segregate family members according to age, thus de-emphasizing family relationships. Inter-generational activities were seen as a means to involve families as units, thus reinforcing family bonds.

Intergenerationality in religion can be conceptualized as the transmission of religious practices, beliefs, or affiliations from parent to child. This approach identifies parents as possessing religious agency and places young people as passive recipients of religion and the behavioral characteristics associated with a particular kind of faith. Research also finds that children serve in a reciprocal approach, where the young person might influence the adult's religiosity and practices of worship and faith.

Studies  show that children attending Sunday Schools and youth programs are less likely to continue church involvement, compared to those who attended worship with parents, and are integrated into a community (e.g., Mark de Vries Family-Based Youth Ministry, 2004). Those children who continue church involvement as adults often have a ‘nominal faith’ (e.g. George Barna Transforming children into Spiritual Champions, 2003).

Proponents of this mode of ministry claim it is a Biblical model - particularly when the ministry is located within the family in accordance with the 'relational' Hebrew model described in Deuteronomy 6.

See also 
 Generational accounting
 Transgenerational design
 Transgenerational trauma
 National memory
 Cultural memory

References 

Cultural generations